Pedro Carvalho may refer to:

 Pedro Carvalho (rugby union) (born 1984), Portuguese rugby union player
 Pedro Carvalho (actor) (born 1985), Portuguese actor
 Pedro Carvalho (fighter) (born 1995), Portuguese mixed martial artist competing in Bellator MMA